Álvaro José Zamora Mata (born 9 March 2002) is a Costa Rican professional footballer who plays as a midfielder for Costa Rican club Deportivo Saprissa and the Costa Rica national team.

International career
Zamora made his national team debut for Costa Rica in a friendly against South Korea national football team on 23 September 2022. He came in as a substitute for Gerson Torres at half-time.
 
He was called up to the final 26-man Costa Rica squad for the 2022 FIFA World Cup in Qatar.

References

External links
 
 

2002 births
Living people
Costa Rican footballers
Association football midfielders
Deportivo Saprissa players
Costa Rica international footballers
2022 FIFA World Cup players